Huvepharma Arena is a multi-purpose stadium in Razgrad, Bulgaria.  It is used for football matches and is the home ground of the local football club Ludogorets Razgrad. The stadium has a seating capacity of 10,423 spectators.

History 
The stadium was officially opened on 25 September 2011, with Bulgarian Prime Minister Boyko Borisov and Bulgarian Football Union president Borislav Mihaylov present at the ceremony.

Starting from August 2014, Ludogorets began a project to reconstruct the stadium and expand its capacity to 12,500, in order to accommodate European tournament matches.

The first stand to be reconstructed was officially unveiled on 15 May 2015, as Ludogorets clinched their fourth consecutive Bulgarian First League title in a 4–1 win against Lokomotiv Sofia. The sector carries a capacity of 2,038 people and was named after Romanian defender Cosmin Moți in recognition of his performance during the 2014–15 UEFA Champions League play-off round second leg against Steaua București, when he replaced the sent-off goalkeeper Vladislav Stoyanov to save two penalty kicks and score one himself, qualifying his team to the group stage for the first time in the club's history.

On 12 August 2017, the club inaugurated the newly modernized east stand before a league match against Vereya Stara Zagora. The stand, which was built in just five months, added 3,500 seats to the stadium's capacity, bringing the total number up to 9,000 seats. This allowed Ludogorets Arena to host Champions League and Europa League group stage matches for the first time ever, starting from the 2017–18 season onwards. Club officials later announced that they will build a copy of the 'Moți' stand on the north end next, before proceeding with construction of the main one.

On 28 September 2017, the stadium hosted its first ever European competition group stage game, as Ludogorets defeated 1899 Hoffenheim 2–1 in a Group C Europa League fixture, with 6,155 fans in attendance.

On 11 July 2018, Ludogorets officially opened the newly renovated north stand before their Champions League first-round game against Crusaders FC. The sector added a further 2,208 seats to the stadium's capacity, raising it to 10,442.

On 18 December 2019, it was announced that the stadium's name had been changed to Huvepharma Arena.

Other tenants 

Ludogorets Arena has hosted a number of other teams since its reopening in 2011. Between 2015 and 2017 it was home to Ludogorets' reserve team, Ludogorets Razgrad II, before they moved to the newly built 2,000-capacity Eagles' Nest located at the club's training centre, the Sport Center Ludogorets.

Following the promotion of Dunav Ruse to the First League in 2016, their Gradski Stadium had to be renovated to meet the licensing criteria of the Bulgarian Football Union. Starting from July 2016, Dunav played their home games at the Ludogorets Arena, until they returned to Ruse on 28 April 2017.

National teams 
On 8 September 2015, Ludogorets Arena hosted the Bulgaria national under-21 football team for the first time ever, as they defeated Luxembourg 3–0 in a Group 5 qualifier for the 2017 UEFA European Under-21 Championship in front of a crowd of 2,200. As of March 2018 this remains the only under-21 game played in Razgrad.

The stadium was host to the Bulgarian national football team for the first time on 23 March 2018, in a 1–0 friendly game loss against Bosnia and Herzegovina in front of 2,200 spectators. 

From June 2 to September 23, 2022, the stadium hosted all three home games in Bulgaria's campaign in 2022–23 UEFA Nations League C.

International matches

Bulgaria national football team
Senior teams only.

Attendance figures

Gallery

References

External links

Ludogorets Arena page at Ludogorets.com (in Bulgarian)
Ludogorets Arena page at Stadiumdb.com

Football venues in Bulgaria
Razgrad
Buildings and structures in Razgrad Province